The Joe may refer to either one of the following sporting venues:

Joe Louis Arena, former home of the Detroit Red Wings (demolished)
Sewell–Thomas Stadium, home stadium of the Alabama Crimson Tide baseball team
Joseph L. Bruno Stadium, home of the Tri-City ValleyCats